The Bradley Covered Bridge is a historic covered bridge, carrying Center Street over Miller Run, a tributary of the Passumpsic River, in Lyndon, Vermont.  Built in 1878, it is the last of Vermont's many 19th-century covered bridges to carry a numbered state highway (first Vermont Route 122 then later Vermont Route 122 Alternate).  The bridge was listed on the National Register of Historic Places in 1977.

Description and history
The Bradley Covered Bridge is located north of central Lyndon, crossing Miller Run on Central Street just south of its junction with Gilman Road. The latter carries Vermont Route 122 on the north side of Miller Run, while Central Street runs south to the downtown area. It is covered by a metal roof, and rests on abutments either faced or built out of concrete. Its sides are sheathed for half their height by vertical board siding. A sidewalk has been cantilevered out to the bridge's east side; it is sheltered by a shed roof offset main roof. The bridge's decking consists of wood planking.

The bridge was built in 1878 by E.H. Stone. It is similar in construction to five other area bridges, whose shared characteristics include extended eaves, half-wall siding, and portals with diagonal corners. In 1973, the bridge was crossed by an overheight truck, doing substantial damage to its south portal.  The bridge has since then undergone restoration and was renovated in 1995.

See also
 
 
 
 

 List of covered bridges in Vermont
 National Register of Historic Places listings in Caledonia County, Vermont
 List of bridges on the National Register of Historic Places in Vermont

References

Bridges completed in 1878
Covered bridges on the National Register of Historic Places in Vermont
Buildings and structures in Lyndon, Vermont
Queen post truss bridges in the United States
Covered bridges in Caledonia County, Vermont
National Register of Historic Places in Caledonia County, Vermont
Road bridges on the National Register of Historic Places in Vermont
Wooden bridges in Vermont
1878 establishments in Vermont